John Sansom (born 20 December 1936) is a South African cricketer. He played in six first-class matches for Border from 1962/63 to 1965/66.

See also
 List of Border representative cricketers

References

External links
 

1936 births
Living people
South African cricketers
Border cricketers
Cricketers from East London, Eastern Cape